Ouachita Parish (French: Paroisse d'Ouachita) is located in the northern part of the U.S. state of Louisiana. As of the 2020 census, the population was 160,368. The parish seat is Monroe. The parish was formed in 1807.

Ouachita Parish is part of the Monroe, LA Metropolitan Statistical Area. Located here is Watson Brake, the oldest indigenous earthwork mound complex in North America. It was built around 3500 BCE, making it older than the Ancient Egyptian pyramids or Britain's Stonehenge. It is on privately owned land and not available for public viewing.

History

Prehistory

Ouachita Parish was the home to many succeeding Native American groups in the thousands of years before Europeans colonized the area. Peoples of the Marksville culture, Troyville culture, Coles Creek culture and Plaquemine culture built villages and earthwork mound sites throughout the area. Notable examples include the Filhiol Mound Site, located on a natural levee of the Ouachita River.

The oldest and most significant is Watson Brake, the most ancient mound complex in North America, dated to 5400 BP (before present), or about 3500 BCE. Its dating changed archeologists' understanding of the antiquity of mounds in North America and what types of cultures constructed them. This site is located on private land and not available for viewing.

Historic era
The parish was named after the Ouachita River, which flows through southern Arkansas and northeastern Louisiana, and the Ouachita tribe who lived along it. Beginning about 1720, French settlers arrived in what became organized as modern Ouachita Parish. Colonists developed a plantation on Bayou DeSiard that used African slave labor. The Natchez Indians destroyed the Ouachita plantations during the Natchez Revolt of 1729–1731, and the French did not return.

Beginning in the 1750s, Choctaw Indians began hunting in northern Louisiana, including the Ouachita country, expanding from their traditional territory in what is now Mississippi. At the time, only a few French families moved north into this area from the Opelousas Post on the Red River.

Following its defeat in the Seven Years' War, in 1763 France ceded its territories in North America east of the Mississippi River to the victor Great Britain. Spain took over French territories west of the Mississippi, including nominally in Louisiana. In 1769, Alejandro O'Reilly, the first Spanish governor to rule successfully in West Louisiana, claimed Ouachita Parish for Spain. A census of the parish that year recorded 110 white people. In 1769 Spain abolished the Indian slave trade and Indian slavery in its colonies.

Even in the 19th century, after the United States acquired this territory in the Louisiana Purchase of 1803, some mixed-race American slaves were able to win freedom suits by proving Indian ancestry in their maternal line; under most southern state slave laws, children were born into the status of the mother. Thus a mixed-race child of an Indian mother or grandmother was legally free in former Spanish territory west of the Mississippi River, such as Louisiana, Arkansas or Missouri, as the Indians had been free people since 1769.

In 1783, Don Juan Filhiol was among Frenchmen who began to work for the Spanish colonial government in Louisiana.  (He was born Jean-Baptiste Filhiol (1740) in Eymet, France (near Bordeaux), to French Calvinists François Filhiol and Anne Marie Teyssonnière, cloth merchants.) He was assigned that year to establish the first European outpost in the area of the Ouachita River Valley, called Poste d'Ouachita. With his wife, a few soldiers and slaves, his small party made the slow, arduous journey by keelboat up the Mississippi, Red, Black and Ouachita rivers to reach this area. In 1785 the European population of the entire Ouachita District (which extended into present-day Arkansas) was only 207.

Originally based in Arkansas, Filhiol surveyed his grant and settled in 1785 at Prairie des Canots (included within the present-day city of Monroe). He gradually organized settlers, including trying to train some in military skills. He built Fort Miro on his land to provide protection for settlers from the Indians. At the same time, he worked to establish trade with the Chickasaw people and other Native Americans of the area. He was tasked with organizing the settlers in the Ouachita River Valley, while keeping out Americans and establishing good relations for trade with the Native Americans. Filhio served as commandant of Poste d'Ouachita until 1800, when he retired. He continued to live on his plantation here.

Acquired by United States
Other settlers and merchants were attracted to the trading post, which became known as Fort Miro, with a town developing by 1805, two years after the United States acquired the Louisiana Purchase from France. This was the vast former French territory (France had reacquired it from Spain for a brief period) west of the Mississippi and outside the Southwest and California, which were still Spanish territory. In 1819 the Americans renamed Fort Miro as the Ouachita Post. A year or so later, they changed the town's name to Monroe, after the first steamboat to reach it in travel up the Ouachita River. The arrival of the powered paddle wheeler was a landmark event, as it connected the town to much easier travel to and from other markets and stimulated its growth.

On March 31, 1807, the Territory of Orleans was divided into 19 sub-districts. The very large Ouachita Parish was one of these original 19; later it was broken up into eight other parishes (Morehouse, Caldwell, Union, Franklin, Tensas, Madison, East Carroll, and West Carroll), as more settlers entered the area and developed towns and plantations. Some brought slaves with them, but many bought slaves at markets. In the early 19th century, a total of one million slaves were forcibly moved through the domestic slave trade from the Upper South to the Deep South of the cotton plantation districts. They traveled overland or were shipped in the coastwise trade to Gulf ports.

Post-Reconstruction to present
Following the Reconstruction era, as white Democrats regained control of the state government, they increasingly worked to re-establish dominance over the freedmen in Ouachita Parish. Elections were often won by intimidation and fraud, and they worked to establish white supremacy. Particularly in the late 19th and early 20th centuries, lynchings mostly of black men by white mobs in Ouachita and across the South were a form of racial terror by which the whites enforced their dominance. A 2015 study of lynchings found that from 1877 to 1950, a total of 38 people were lynched in Ouachita Parish. This was the third-highest total in the state, and the fifth-highest total of lynchings of any county in the South. Among the victims was George Bolden, an illiterate black man "accused of writing a lewd note to a white woman." Before he went to trial, he was lynched near Monroe on April 30, 1919.

In 1883, the first railroad bridge across the Ouachita River was built, improving connections for the town with other markets.

In 1916, the Monroe natural gas field was discovered. As a result, for a time the city of Monroe was known as the natural gas capital of the world. The new industry generated many jobs. From 1920 to 1930, the population of Ouachita Parish increased by more than 79 percent, to 54,000 people, as migrants arrived for work. (see Demographics section and table.)

The town of Sterlington was incorporated in August 1961, and in 1974 the town of Richwood was incorporated. Ouachita Parish's boundaries have changed 23 times during its history, mostly due to the formation of other parishes in the 19th century.

Geography

Major highways
  Interstate 20
  U.S. Highway 80
  U.S. Highway 165
  Louisiana Highway 2
  Louisiana Highway 15
  Louisiana Highway 34
  Louisiana Highway 143

Adjacent parishes
 Union Parish  (north)
 Morehouse Parish  (northeast)
 Richland Parish  (east)
 Caldwell Parish  (south)
 Jackson Parish  (southwest)
 Lincoln Parish  (west)

National protected areas
 Black Bayou Lake National Wildlife Refuge
 D'Arbonne National Wildlife Refuge (part)

Demographics

2020 census

As of the 2020 United States census, there were 160,368 people, 57,835 households, and 34,816 families residing in the parish.

2000 census
As of the census of 2000, there were 147,250 people, 55,216 households, and 38,319 families residing in the parish. There were 60,154 housing units at an average density of 98 per square mile (38/km2). The racial makeup of the parish was 64.48% White, 33.63% Black or African American, 0.23% Native American, 0.64% Asian, 0.03% Pacific Islander, 0.33% from other races, and 0.67% from two or more races.  1.19% of the population were Hispanic or Latino of any race.

There were 55,216 households, out of which 34.20% had children under the age of 18 living with them, 47.70% were married couples living together, 17.90% had a female householder with no husband present, and 30.60% were non-families. 25.80% of all households were made up of individuals, and 9.30% had someone living alone who was 65 years of age or older.  The average household size was 2.58 and the average family size was 3.12.

In the parish the population was spread out, with 27.90% under the age of 18, 12.00% from 18 to 24, 27.90% from 25 to 44, 20.30% from 45 to 64, and 11.80% who were 65 years of age or older.  The median age was 32 years. For every 100 females there were 89.30 males.  For every 100 females age 18 and over, there were 84.50 males.

The median income for a household in the parish was $32,047, and the median income for a family was $40,206. Males had a median income of $31,616 versus $23,139 for females. The per capita income for the parish was $17,084.  About 15.80% of families and 20.70% of the population were below the poverty line, including 29.70% of those under age 18 and 15.80% of those age 65 or over.

Economy
The top employers in the parish, according to the North Louisiana Economic Partnership, are:

Law enforcement

The Ouachita Parish Sheriff's Office (OPSO) is the primary law enforcement agency of Ouachita Parish. It falls under the authority of the Sheriff, who is the chief law enforcement officer of the parish. Since the formation of the Sheriff's Office, six deputies and one Sheriff have been killed in the line of duty, the most common cause being gunfire. The Ouachita Correctional Center (OCC) was opened in 1963, presently houses a maximum of 1,062 offenders, and employs 124 full time deputies.

Politics

Education

Ouachita Parish School Board serves areas outside of the City of Monroe with primary and secondary schools. Monroe City School System serves areas within Monroe.

Monroe is also the home of the University of Louisiana at Monroe.

Media
A documentary entitled The Gift of the Ouachita by filmmaker George C. Brian (1919–2007), head of the Division of Theater and Drama at the University of Louisiana at Monroe is a history of Monroe as the "gift of the Ouachita River".

National Guard
1022nd Engineer Company (Vertical) of the 527th Engineer Battalion of the 225th Engineer Brigade is located in West Monroe, Louisiana. 528th Engineer Battalion (To the Very End) also part of the 225th Engineer Brigade is headquartered in Monroe.

Communities

Cities 
 Monroe (parish seat and largest municipality)
 West Monroe

Towns
 Richwood
 Sterlington

Unincorporated areas

Census-designated places 
 Bawcomville
 Brownsville
 Calhoun
 Claiborne
 Lakeshore
 Swartz

Other unincorporated communities 
 Bosco
 Fairbanks
 Pine Grove
 Wham

Notable people
 Joseph A. Biedenharn
 Evelyn Blackmon
 Samuel B. Fuller
 James D. Halsell
 Dixon Hearne
 Alton Hardy Howard
 Newt V. Mills
 Mike Walsworth
 Willie Robertson
 Phil Robertson
 Si Robertson
 Jase Robertson
 Edwin Francis Jemison

See also

 National Register of Historic Places listings in Ouachita Parish, Louisiana

References

 
Louisiana parishes
Louisiana placenames of Native American origin
Parishes in Monroe, Louisiana metropolitan area
1807 establishments in the Territory of Orleans
Populated places established in 1807